Charles Villeneuve (born Charles Leroy; 19 July 1941) is a French journalist.

He was the sports director of the television channel TF1.

On 27 May 2008, he was named as president of Paris Saint-Germain F.C. ahead of the new season, after the one-month interim of Simon Tahar; PSG had narrowly avoided relegation from Ligue 1. He was the third journalist to hold the post, after Michel Denisot and Charles Biétry in the 1990s.

In January 2009, he wrote a letter to the club's board in which he criticised their lack of investment. The letter was leaked to Le Parisien. He was then dismissed by owners Colony Capital, whose president Sébastien Bazin took that position at the club.

References

1941 births
Living people
People from Beirut
French male journalists
French television journalists
French television presenters
20th-century French journalists
21st-century French journalists
French people of Armenian descent

Paris Saint-Germain F.C. presidents